The DePaulia is an entirely student-run weekly newspaper from DePaul University in Chicago, Illinois.

External links
The DePaulia

DePaul University
Student newspapers published in Illinois